The Woodlands is a National Historic Landmark District on the west bank of the Schuylkill River in Philadelphia.  It includes a Federal-style mansion, a matching carriage house and stable, and a garden landscape that in 1840 was transformed into a Victorian rural cemetery with an arboretum of over 1,000 trees. More than 30,000 people are buried at the cemetery.  Among the tombstones at Woodlands cemetery is the tombstone of Dr Thomas W. Evans, which at 150 feet, is both the tallest gravestone in the United States and the tallest obelisk gravestone in the world.

Hamilton estate (1735–1840)
The land that would become The Woodlands was originally a  tract in Blockley Township on the west bank of the Schuylkill River. It was purchased in 1735 by the famous Philadelphia lawyer Andrew Hamilton.

When Hamilton died in 1741, he willed his lands to his son, also named Andrew. The son survived his father by only six years, but in that time built up his landholdings enough to leave a  estate to his own son, William Hamilton (1745–1813), who acquired it at the age of twenty-one.  William built a Georgian-style mansion with a grand, two-storied portico overlooking the river above Gray's Ferry.  Following a trip to England after the American Revolution, Hamilton doubled the size of the dwelling, creating a 16-room manor with kitchens and service rooms in a windowed ground floor. The rebuilt Woodlands mansion became one of the greatest domestic American architectural achievements of the 18th century, recognized as a leading example of English taste and presaging architectural trends in the following century.

Hamilton was an active botanist, and his estate and greenhouses grew to contain more than 10,000 species of plants, including the first specimens introduced into America of the Ginkgo biloba, Paper Mulberry, Sycamore Maple, Ailanthus,  Caucasian Zelkova, and Lombardy Poplar as well as plants grown from seeds harvested during Lewis and Clark’s expeditions, especially the Osage Orange (Maclura pomifera). Hamilton also collected and exchanged numerous native plants with his friends and neighbors, the Bartram family of botanists from nearby Bartram's Garden.

At one time, the estate covered  and stretched from the Schuylkill River to what is now Market Street on the north and 42nd Street on the west and incorporated Hamilton Village.

Cemetery (1840–1960)

After Hamilton died in 1813, his heirs sold off much of the Woodlands estate for institutional and residential development. By the first quarter of the 19th century, the West Philadelphia district was becoming a fashionable suburb.  In order to save the core of Hamilton's estate, in 1840, The Woodlands Cemetery Company of Philadelphia purchased the last , which included the mansion, carriage house, greenhouse and hot houses, as well as extensive plantings.  The founders concluded that The Woodlands' isolated location, its array of exotic trees and its commanding view of the Schuylkill River provided an ideal site for a rural cemetery. John McArthur, Jr. designed the entrance architecture, which was demolished in 1936.

As with its rival to the north, Laurel Hill Cemetery, trustees of the Woodlands spurred the cemetery's early growth by interring the remains of a celebrity: Commodore David Porter. His remains, originally buried at the Philadelphia Naval Asylum cemetery, were reburied at Woodlands in 1845. By mid-century, The Woodlands was thriving and attracted many of Philadelphia's renowned industrialists, medical professionals, artists, writers, and veterans.

In 1853, the land along the river was sold to the West Chester and Philadelphia Railroad, which built a rail line along it. Over the next century, other railroads, particularly the Pennsylvania Railroad, added tracks. Today, eight tracks run along former Woodlands land, serving Amtrak passenger trains, Conrail freight, and the SEPTA Airport and Media commuter lines.

The Woodlands was a part of the United States National Cemetery System during the American Civil War with a leased lot within the cemetery for soldiers that died in nearby hospitals. The soldiers' remains were reinterred to the Philadelphia National Cemetery in 1885.

Modern use (1960–)

The Woodlands estate was designated a National Historic Landmark in 1967. In 2006, the cemetery and other structures on the site were added to form a National Historic Landmark District.

Today, The Woodlands Cemetery Company of Philadelphia exists as a non-profit cemetery corporation that promotes both traditional and current burial practices on its  of land in University City. The company is supported by The Woodlands Trust for Historic Preservation, a non-profit corporation, dedicated to the preservation and promotion of the cemetery, mansion, and arboretum as a cultural landscape between the University of Pennsylvania and the University of the Sciences in Philadelphia.

The pathways and avenues of the cemetery and mansion make up the Woodlands Heritage National Recreation Trail, part of the National Recreation Trail program. The cemetery includes a looped road system emanating from a central paved circle  with infrequent motor vehicle traffic, making the grounds a safe and quiet place for biking, running and walking. There is also an unpaved path that encircles the perimeter of the grounds that is a popular circuit for University City dog-walkers and runners. Leashed dogs are permitted on the grounds, which are free and open to the public from dawn to dusk. The cemetery also hosts a community garden, community activities, an orchard, and apiary. It is also the headquarters of the Philadelphia Orchard Project.

Notable burials

 John Joseph Abercrombie (1798–1877), Civil War general
 Timothy Shay Arthur (1809–1885), author, founder of Arthur's Home Magazine
 Hartman Bache (1798–1872), Civil War Union brevet brigadier general
 Anthony Joseph Drexel Biddle, Sr. (1875–1948), author, adventurer, the man upon whom the play and film The Happiest Millionaire were based
 Anthony Joseph Drexel Biddle, Jr. (1897–1961), diplomat (cenotaph)
 David B. Birney (1825–1864), Civil War Union major general
 Sylvester Bonnaffon, Jr. (1844–1922), Civil War Medal of Honor recipient
 Benjamin Harris Brewster (1816–1888), presidential cabinet secretary
 Henry Grier Bryant (1859–1932), explorer
 William Bucknell (1811—1890), financier, philanthropist, benefactor to Bucknell University
 William Christian Bullitt (1891–1967), diplomat, journalist, and novelist
 James Hepburn Campbell (1820–1895), U.S. Representative
 Joseph A. Campbell (1817–1900), businessman, founder of Campbell Soup Company
 Edward Coles (1786–1868), 2nd governor of Illinois, private secretary to Presidents Thomas Jefferson and James Madison
 Elliott Cresson (1796–1854), philanthropist
 Paul Philippe Cret (1876–1945), architect, designed the Woodlands' main gate
 Thomas Cripps (1840–1906), Civil War Medal of Honor recipient
 George H. Crosman (1799–1882), Civil War brevet major general
 Jacob Mendes Da Costa (1833–1900), surgeon
 Francis Martin Drexel (1792–1863), Philadelphia banker, progenitor of the Drexel banking dynasty
 Anthony Joseph Drexel (1826–1893), founder of Drexel University
 Joseph William Drexel (1833–1888), banker, trustee of the Metropolitan Museum of Art and the U.S. National Academy of Sciences, and director of the Metropolitan Opera house
 Thomas Eakins (1844–1916), artist, and his wife Susan (1851–1938)
 Thomas W. Evans (1823–1897), dentist
 Wilson Eyre (1858–1944), architect
 Clement Finley (1797–1879), Civil War Union brevet brigadier general
 Alice Fisher (1839–1888), nursing pioneer at the former Philadelphia General Hospital
 Sidney George Fisher (1809–1871) lawyer, farmer, political essayist
 Frederick Fraley (1804–1901) Pennsylvania State Senator from 1837 to 1839
 John Fraser (1825–1906), architect
 Samuel David Gross (1805–1884), medical pioneer
 James Gwyn (1828–1906), Civil War Union brevet major-general
 Ferdinand Vandeveer Hayden (1829–1887), geologist
 Edward W. Heston (1745–1824), PA state senator and Revolutionary War colonel, founder and namesake of Hestonville
 Henry Horn (1786–1862), U.S. Representative
 Charles Jared Ingersoll (1782–1862), U.S. Representative
 William Williams Keen (1837–1932), first U.S. brain surgeon
 Ellis Lewis (1798–1871), Pennsylvania Chief Justice
 James Barton Longacre (1794–1869), engraver
 Silas Weir Mitchell (1829–1914), physician and writer
 Samuel Moore (1774–1861), U.S. Representative
 Anna Claypoole Peale (1791–1878), American miniature painter, daughter of James Peale
 Rembrandt Peale (1778–1860), artist
 Jane Piper (1916–1991), artist
 Eli Kirk Price (1797–1884), lawyer, state senator
 Eli Kirk Price II (1860–1933), lawyer, art patron
 David Porter (1780–1843), naval officer
 William D. Porter (1808–1864), naval officer
 Lewis Redner (1831–1908), organist, composer, wrote the music for Phillips Brooks's poem "O Little Town of Bethlehem"
 William Rush (1756–1833), sculptor
 John Scott (1824–1896), U.S. senator
 Thomas Alexander Scott (1823–1881), president of the Pennsylvania Railroad
 Jessie Willcox Smith (1863–1935), illustrator
 Charles Stewart (1778–1869), naval officer
 Frank R. Stockton (1834–1902), author of "The Lady or the Tiger?" and other tales
 Edward T. Stotesbury (1849–1938), prominent partner at J.P. Morgan & Co. and its Philadelphia affiliate Drexel & Co.
 William Moseley Swain (1809–1868), journalist
 James Thompson (1806–1874), U.S. Representative
 John Edgar Thomson (1808–1874), civil engineer, railroad executive and industrialist
 Ida Waugh (1846–1919), illustrator, and her father Samuel Waugh (1814–1885), artist. His portrait subjects included President Abraham Lincoln and Ulysses S. Grant
 Rufus Welch (1800–1855), circus impresario
 Anne Hollingsworth Wharton (1845–1928), author and historian
 Asa Whitney (1797–1872), railroad magnate
 Alan Wood, Jr., U.S. Representative
 Horatio Curtis Wood (1841–1920), physician

See also

 Mill Creek (Philadelphia)
 List of National Historic Landmarks in Philadelphia
 National Register of Historic Places listings in West Philadelphia

References

External links

 
 
 
 
 
 
 The mansion's listing and images at Philadelphia Architects and Buildings
 The cemetery's listing and images at Philadelphia Architects and Buildings
 The cemetery gate and drive's listing and images at Philadelphia Architects and Buildings
 Three 1924 photos from Gray's Ferry Bridge north to the outlet of Mill Creek and The Woodlands: Photo 1, Photo 2, Photo 3
 The Woodlands Cemetery Company papers, documenting the growth and activities of the cemetery since its founding, are available for research use at the Historical Society of Pennsylvania.

Cemeteries established in the 1840s
Cemeteries in Philadelphia
Cemeteries on the National Register of Historic Places in Philadelphia
National Historic Landmarks in Pennsylvania
Historic American Buildings Survey in Philadelphia
Historic American Landscapes Survey in Pennsylvania
Historic districts on the National Register of Historic Places in Pennsylvania
Houses in Philadelphia
Rural cemeteries
Tourist attractions in Philadelphia
Historic districts in Philadelphia
Federal architecture in Pennsylvania
United States national cemeteries
University City, Philadelphia
National Register of Historic Places in Philadelphia